Apatophysis is a genus of longhorn beetles in the subfamily Dorcasominae.

Species
BioLib includes:
subgenus Angustephysis Pic, 1956
 Apatophysis danczenkoi Danilevsky, 2006
 Apatophysis farsicola Sama, Fallahzadeh & Rapuzzi, 2005
 Apatophysis margiana Semenov & Barovskaya, 1935
 Apatophysis modica Gahan, 1906
 Apatophysis plavilstshikovi Miroshnikov, 1992
subgenus Apatophysis Chevrolat, 1860
 Apatophysis afghanica Miroshnikov, 2014
 Apatophysis anatolica Heyrovský, 1938
 Apatophysis baeckmanniana Semenov, 1907
 Apatophysis barbara (Lucas, 1858) - type species
 Apatophysis caspica Semenov, 1901
 Apatophysis centralis Semenov, 1901
 Apatophysis kashgarica Semenov, 1901
 Apatophysis komarovi Semenov, 1889
 Apatophysis mongolica Semenov, 1901
 Apatophysis pavlovskii Plavilstshikov, 1954
 Apatophysis serricornis Gebler, 1843
 Apatophysis sieversi Ganglbauer, 1887
 Apatophysis sinica Semenov, 1901

References

Dorcasominae